Edward James Lennox (September 12, 1854 – April 15, 1933) was a Toronto-based architect who designed several of the city's most notable landmarks in the late nineteenth and early twentieth centuries, including Old City Hall and Casa Loma. He designed over 70 buildings in the city of Toronto.

Life and career

The son of Irish immigrants, he studied at the Mechanics' Institute in Toronto, where he finished first in his class. Upon graduation in 1874, he apprenticed with architect William Irving for five years. He then formed a partnership with fellow architect William Frederick McCaw, before forming his own firm in 1881.

He quickly became one of the most successful architects in Toronto. He rose to the top of his profession when he won the contract for Toronto City Hall in 1886. His caricature can be seen carved in stone on the facade of Old City Hall—he's the one with the handlebar moustache.

Many of his buildings were designed in the Richardsonian Romanesque style, and he was one of the most important figures in bringing that style to Toronto. His creative prowess in the Romanesque Revival style was especially important in The Annex neighbourhood, where Lennox designed the Lewis Lukes House at 37 Madison Avenue in the mid-1880s, pioneering the Annex House. This style of house is indigenous to Toronto, and it blends elements of Romanesque with that of Queen Anne style.

Later in his life, he served as commissioner of the Toronto Transit Commission from 1923 to 1929.

Buildings

Legacy
A small residential street called E.J. Lennox Way is named for him in Unionville, Ontario, behind the former Unionville Congregational Church.

His son Edgar Edward Lennox was also an architect, as well as brother Charles David Lennox, who worked with E. J. Lennox from 1887 to 1915.

Susan M. Lennox great grand daughter of Charles David Lennox and great great niece of E. J. Lennox also an Architect. Graduate of University of Toronto 1992  Bachelor of Architecture. Co-Founder of Lennox Architects Limited Huntsville Ontario with Susana Marques.

Notes

References
 Lennox, Edward James. The Canadian Encyclopedia.
 Litvak, Marilyn M. Edward James Lennox: Builder of Toronto

External

 E. J. Lennox fonds, Archives of Ontario

1844 births
1933 deaths
People from Old Toronto
Pre-Confederation Ontario people
19th-century Canadian architects
20th-century Canadian architects
Canadian people of Irish descent
Burials at St. James Cemetery, Toronto